Erik Postma (15 December 1953, Rotterdam - 25 September 2002, Middenbeemster) was a Dutch politician of the Democrats 66 party.

In 1992 he was elected as city manager (gemeentesecretaris) of Budel.  After the municipal reorganization of North Brabant on 1 January 1997, Budel was incorporated along with the municipality Maarheeze in the new municipality Cranendonck, and Postma was made city manager.

In April 1998 Postma was appointed mayor of the northern Dutch municipality of Beemster.  During his mayoral term, he died suddenly of cardiac arrest in September 2002.  He was succeeded in his position by Harry Brinkman.

1953 births
2002 deaths
Democrats 66 politicians
Mayors in North Holland
People from Beemster
Politicians from Rotterdam